The Western baseball club of Keokuk, Iowa, or Keokuk Westerns in modern nomenclature, was a professional baseball team in the National Association in 1875, the last season of that first professional league. It is considered a major league team by those who count the NA as a major league. It was geographically the farthest west that major league baseball had progressed up to that time.

In 1875, the NA entry fee was $20 for one championship season. The Westerns won one of 13 games (1–12 record) before going out of business. On June 14, 1875, the Western club played their last game and dropped out of the league two days later. For 1876, stronger clubs in bigger cities, led by the Chicago White Stockings, organized the National League on a different basis, chiefly in order to exclude weaker clubs from smaller cities such as Keokuk.

The Westerns were managed by Joe Simmons and played their home games at Perry Park, which was located in a field located beyond Rand Park. Their top hitter was catcher Paddy Quinn, who went 14-for-43 for a batting average of .326.

See also
1875 Keokuk Westerns season

References

External links
 Keokuk Westerns Index

Defunct National Association baseball teams
Defunct baseball teams in Iowa
Baseball teams disestablished in 1875
Baseball teams established in 1875